Seputar Indonesia (translated Around Indonesia) was Indonesia's longest running flagship newscast carried by a private television network. It debuted for the first time on the newly inaugurated RCTI on 15 November 1989 as the local news program Seputar Jakarta (Around Jakarta), as well as the network's first newscast before it evolved to go nationwide on 15 November 1990. Since the end of 2005, the program has regained its position as the most-watched newscast in the country, according to ratings by Nielsen Media Research. During its early years, Seputar Indonesia was also carried by RCTI's then sister network SCTV.

On 9 February 2009, Seputar Indonesia was revamped and was the only news program on RCTI, under an initiative called Satu Seputar Indonesia (One Around Indonesia). The morning news program, Nuansa Pagi was renamed Seputar Indonesia Pagi. The lunchtime news program, Buletin Siang renamed Seputar Indonesia Siang. The late night news program, Buletin Malam was renamed Seputar Indonesia Malam. The main evening edition retained the Seputar Indonesia name due to the historical context.

On 1 November 2017, along with rebranding that includes iNews brand for MNCTV and GTV newscasts, it was replaced by Seputar iNews.

Historically, it was also broadcast by SCTV before the network would produce their own news program, Liputan 6 respectively.

Logos

On 15 November 1989, the Seputar Indonesia logo used only the phrase 'SEPUTAR JAKARTA' which was formerly the logo used on 15 November 1989 until 14 November 1990.

On 15 November 1990, the Seputar Indonesia logo used only the phrase 'SEPUTAR INDONESIA' which was renamed and used from what was formerly named Seputar Jakarta by the logo was used on 15 November 1990 until 23 August 1997.

On 24 August 1997, the Seputar Indonesia logo is closed by a circular red ring with word seputar INDONESIA (the word seputar at the top with the word INDONESIA at the bottom) by the logo was used on 24 August 1997 until 31 July 2002.

On 1 August 2002, Seputar Indonesia replaced the logo with a blue ball closed rings (in a similar shape to Saturn) was used until 24 August 2006.

On 25 August 2006, the logo changed again into a ball bearing the front of RCTI by the logo continued to be used until 9 February 2009.

On 9 February 2009, Seputar Indonesia relaunched the logo and was used until 31 October 2017. The logo is almost similar to the Firefox logo.

Anchors and former anchors

 Atika Suri
 Desi Anwar
 Helmi Johannes
 Putra Nababan
 Aiman Witjaksono
 Trishna Sanubari
 Dana Iswara
 Adolf Posumah
 Asti Husadi
 F.A. Prasetyo
 Ade Novit
 Zsa Zsa Yusharyahya
 Ratna Komala
 Iwan Emawan Malik
 Edwin Nazir
 Inne Sudjono
 Devi Trianna

Scheduling of main news program

Seputar Jakarta
16:00-16:30 WIB (15 November 1989 – 14 November 1990)

Seputar Indonesia Pagi
04:30-06:00 WIB (9 February 2009 – 31 October 2017)

Seputar Indonesia Siang
12:00-12:30 WIB (9 February 2009 – 11 May 2014)
11:30-12:00 WIB (12 May 2014 – 31 October 2017)

Seputar Indonesia
18:30-19:00 WIB (15 November 1990 – 31 December 2004)
18:00-18:30 WIB (1 January 2005 – 23 August 2006)
17:30-18:00 WIB (24 August 2006 – 8 February 2009)
17:00-17:30 WIB (9 February 2009 – 23 August 2012)
16:30-17:00 WIB (24 August 2012 – 31 October 2017)

Seputar Indonesia Malam
01:30-02:00 WIB (9 February 2009 – 31 October 2017)

Broadcasts in other stations and countries

Seputar Indonesia was formerly broadcast on SCTV from 24 August 1990 until 19 May 1996.

The program is also aired internationally, such as in Macau (Macau TV by Teledifusao de Macau from 2 January until 31 October 2017).

See also
Nuansa Pagi (renamed Seputar Indonesia Pagi and later Seputar iNews Pagi)
Buletin Siang (renamed Seputar Indonesia Siang and later Seputar iNews Siang)
Buletin Malam (renamed Seputar Indonesia Malam and later Seputar iNews Malam)

External links
Official site
Description of Seputar Indonesia on RCTI site

Indonesian television news shows
Indonesian-language television shows
1989 Indonesian television series debuts
1990 Indonesian television series debuts
2017 Indonesian television series endings
1980s Indonesian television series
1990s Indonesian television series
2000s Indonesian television series
2010s Indonesian television series
RCTI original programming
Flagship evening news shows